is a Japanese actress. From 2001 and 2003, she was known as "Mini Stop-chan", acting as the mascot for the Ministop convenience store chain commercials in Japan. She is the owner of a unique voice and has held a recital with upcoming star Satoshi Tsumabuki. Since November 2005, she has been on the A&G Radio Show: Anisupa! segment Anisupa Kōnin Akujo Queen. Her major roles in anime include Maya Tōmi in Fafner in the Azure, Chocolat Meilleure in Sugar Sugar Rune, Miwako Sakurada in Paradise Kiss, Kazamori Sasa in Un-Go and Diancie in Pokémon the Movie: Diancie and the Cocoon of Destruction. In video games, she provides the voice of Rikku in Final Fantasy X, Final Fantasy X-2, and Kingdom Hearts II. In live-action films, she portrayed herself in the Kōji Shiraishi-directed horror film The Curse, and Yuka Morita in the Takashi Shimizu film Reincarnation.

Filmography

Live-action film

Live-action television

TV anime

Animated films

Video games

Other work

References

External links
 
Official agency profile 
タレントデータバンク 松本まりかインタビュー 

1984 births
Living people
Japanese film actresses
Japanese television actresses
Japanese video game actresses
Japanese voice actresses
Voice actresses from Tokyo
21st-century Japanese actresses